Jehanabad railway station, station code JHD, is the railway station serving the city of Jehanabad in the Jehanabad district in the Indian state of Bihar. The Jehanabad railway station is well connected to Patna, Gaya, Ranchi and Bokaro by the railway network.
Jehanabad lies in between Patna–Gaya line which is one of the busiest rail route in India. Jehanabad has trains running frequently to Patna and Ranchi. The city is a major railway hub and has four stations Jehanabad railway station, Jehanabad Court, Makhdumpur–Gaya and Tehta. Jehanabad is well connected with Gaya, Patna, Biharsharif, Rajgir, Islampur and Jhajha through daily passenger and express train services.

Facilities

The major facilities available are waiting rooms, retiring room, computerised reservation facility, reservation counter, vehicle parking etc. The vehicles are allowed to enter the station premises. There are refreshment rooms vegetarian and non-vegetarian, tea stall, book stall, post and telegraphic office and Government Railway Police (GRP) office.

Platforms 

There are 3 platforms at Jehanabad railway station. The platforms are interconnected with  foot overbridge (FOB).

References

Danapur railway division
Jehanabad
Railway stations in Jehanabad district
Railway stations opened in 1905
1905 establishments in India